Can't Help Myself may refer to:

 "Can't Help Myself" (Flowers song), 1980
 "Can't Help Myself" (Dean Brody and The Reklaws song), 2020
 "Can't Help Myself", a 2020 song by Kita Alexander
 "Can't Help Myself", a song by Destiny's Child from the 1999 album The Writing's on the Wall
 "Can't Help Myself", an art piece by Sun Yuan and Peng Yu, 2016

See also
 I Can't Help Myself (disambiguation)